Alludu Diddina Kapuram is a 1991 Indian Telugu-language action comedy film written, edited and directed by Krishna who also played the lead role alongside Shobhana, Mohan Babu and Saroja Devi. U. Satyanarayana Babu produced the film for Padmavathi Films. The film opened to largely negative reviews and bombed badly at the box office.

Cast 
 Krishna
 Shobhana
 Mohan Babu
 Saroja Devi
 Manasa
 Siva Krishna
 Prabhakara Reddy
 Kantha Rao
 Gollapudi Maruthi Rao
 Giribabu
 Disco Shanti
 Ashok Kumar
 Devadas Kanakala

Songs 
Chakravarthy scored and composed the film's soundtrack.

References

External links 

1991 films
Indian action comedy films
Films scored by K. Chakravarthy
1991 action comedy films